The 2016–17 season of the 1. Liga Promotion, the third tier of the Swiss football league system, was the fifth season of the league.

The season started on 3 August 2016 and finished on 27 May 2017. The league was won by FC Rapperswil-Jona while FC Tuggen were relegated to the 1. Liga Promotion.

Teams

Stadia and locations

The 2016–17 season saw three new clubs in the league, FC La Chaux-de-Fonds, FC Bavois and FC United Zürich who were all promoted from the 1. Liga Classic. No club was relegated from the Challenge League as FC Biel-Bienne was stripped of their league licence by the Swiss Football Association and subsequently declared bankrupt.

Table

Season statistics

Top scorers

References

External links 
  

Swiss Liga Promotion
3